Insane Coaster Wars is an American television series broadcast by Travel Channel that premiered on July 8, 2012, and has three completed seasons. Each episode is based on a certain roller coaster category and features four coaster's per category. Before the series began, Travel Channel announced the four roller coasters in each category and allowed voters to decide which one is the best. At the end of each episode, the ride with the most votes would be the winner. Also, in the seventh episode, the top ten roller coasters from past episodes were grouped together and one was named the best.

Series overview

Episodes

Season 1

Season 2 (Coaster Wars: World Domination)

Season 3 (Coaster Wars: World Domination)

References

Lists of American non-fiction television series episodes